The Conscript is a 1974 Belgian drama film directed by Roland Verhavert, based on the eponymous novel by Hendrik Conscience. It was entered into the 24th Berlin International Film Festival. It was also selected as the Belgian entry for the Best Foreign Language Film at the 47th Academy Awards, but was not accepted as a nominee.

Plot
Flanders, early 19th century. The poor farmer's boy Jan Braems takes the place of the son of a rich man who would've otherwise been drafted in the army. Braems joins the army, where he visits a prostitute and contracts an STD. After taking some ill advice from his comrades he washes his eyes with his own urine, which causes him to go blind. Nevertheless his girlfriend refuses to part from him, no matter what circumstances.

Cast
 Jan Decleir as Jan Braems
 Ansje Beentjes as Katrien
 Gaston Vandermeulen as Grootvader
 Gella Allaert as Katriens moeder
 Bernard Verheyden as Karel
 Idwig Stéphane as Korporaal
 Eddy Asselbergs as Boef (I)
 Leo Madder as Boef (II)
 Denise Zimmerman as Vrouw van kommandant
 Rudi Van Vlaenderen as Dokter
 Johan Vanderbracht as Kommandant
 Gilbert Charles
 Werner Kopers as Maris
 Marieke van Leeuwen as Hoertje

See also
 List of submissions to the 47th Academy Awards for Best Foreign Language Film
 List of Belgian submissions for the Academy Award for Best Foreign Language Film

References

External links
 

1974 films
Belgian drama films
1970s Dutch-language films
1974 drama films
Films set in Belgium
Films shot in Belgium
Works set in Flanders
Films about sexually transmitted diseases
Napoleonic Wars films
Films set in the 1800s
Films based on works by Hendrik Conscience
Films directed by Roland Verhavert